Thomas Boyce (c. 1732?–1793), was an English cleric and dramatist.

Life
He was born at Swanton, Norfolk, the son of John Boyce, brewer, of Norfolk. Boyce spent four years under Mr. Bullimer at Norwich, and four at Scarning under Mr. Brett.  He was admitted pensioner 17 March 1749-50 to Caius College, Cambridge, proceeding B.A. in 1754 and M.A. in 1767. Ordained deacon 2 Nov. 1755, he served as curate of Cringleford in 1768, and rector of Worlingham, Suffolk, from 1780 until his death. He also served as chaplain to the Earl of Suffolk.

Boyce died 4 February 1793, in his 62nd year.

Works
Boyce was the author of A specimen of Elegiac Poetry, 1773, and one tragedy, Harold, London 1786, which was never acted. In the preface to this he states that when he wrote it he was unaware that Richard Cumberland's play on the same subject was in rehearsal at Drury Lane.

Plays
 Harold: a tragedy, Thomas Boyce, (London 1786).

References

  A New Biographical dictionary, Volume 1, Thompson Cooper, p. 272, (London 1873).
  Biographical history of Gonville and Caius college, VOL. II, p. 64, John Venn, (Cambridge 1898).
  The East Anglian: or, Notes and queries, p. 207, ed. Samuel Tymms, (London 1869). Mural tablet found at S. aisle entrance to Worlingham Church, Suffolk.

1730s births
1793 deaths
English dramatists and playwrights
18th-century English writers
18th-century English male writers
18th-century British dramatists and playwrights
Year of birth uncertain
People from Swanton Morley
Alumni of Gonville and Caius College, Cambridge
18th-century English Anglican priests
English male dramatists and playwrights
People from South Norfolk (district)
People from Waveney District